tRNA 2'-phosphotransferase 1 is an enzyme that in humans is encoded by the TRPT1 gene.

References

Further reading